"Wide Eyed and Legless" is a song written and performed by Andy Fairweather Low in 1975. The track peaked at No. 6 in the UK Singles Chart in December that year.  It had originally been published on Fairweather Low's album, La Booga Rooga, which was released earlier the same year. The track was produced by Glyn Johns.

In Australia, the track was issued with "Halfway to Everything" (another track from La Booga Rooga) on the B-side.

Wide Eyed and Legless: 1970-1997 was the title of a compilation album issued by Fairweather Low in 2004.

Personnel
Andy Fairweather Low – vocals, high string guitar
Bernie Leadon – acoustic guitar
B. J. Cole – pedal steel guitar (phased)
John Bundrick - electric piano (phased)
John David – bass guitar
Bruce Rowland – drums
Brian Rogers – string arrangement
Glyn Johns – cabasa, engineering and production

The track was a 1975 copyright to Rondor Music London Ltd

References

External links
 YouTube video

1975 songs
1975 singles
A&M Records singles
Song recordings produced by Glyn Johns
Songs about alcohol